is a hack and slash video game set in Ancient China, during a period called Three Kingdoms (around 200AD). This game is the sixth official installment in the Dynasty Warriors series, developed by Omega Force and published by Koei. The game was released on November 11, 2007 in Japan; the North American release was February 19, 2008 while the Europe release date was March 7, 2008. A version of the game was bundled with the 40GB PlayStation 3 in Japan. Dynasty Warriors 6 was also released for Windows in July 2008. A version for PlayStation 2 was released on October and November 2008 in Japan and North America respectively. An expansion, titled Dynasty Warriors 6: Empires was unveiled at the 2008 Tokyo Game Show and released in May 2009.

Gameplay
This installment varies greatly from past games in the series. One of the game's key additions is the Renbu system, a new way for characters to build up their attack combos. In previous installments in the series, combos were affected by the quality of weapon the character was wielding, with more powerful weapons allowing characters longer, more elaborate and often more powerful consecutive attacks. The Renbu system replaces this system with a gauge that gradually fills as you perform attacks. Performing attacks and dealing damage to the enemy fills the Renbu gauge, eventually earning a new rank/level, while taking damage and not attacking for a time drops the gauge; if you take a lot of damage or go for a long time without inflicting damage then the gauge may even drop back down to the previous level. However even at Renbu Rank 1 characters will be able to perform non-ending combos on the enemy. Without unlocking Renbu Ranks 3 and Infinite from the skill tree though, players can only progress to Renbu Rank 2 (with the exception of the temporary Rank Infinity acquired temporarily by collecting a certain item on the battlefield).

Another major addition is the skill tree, from which characters can earn higher Renbu Ranks, special abilities and improve their attributes. As the progression of the skill tree moves from left to right, those on the right side of the tree are harder to unlock than those on the left. Typically the one which unlocks Infinite Renbu is on the farthest right.

Unique movesets for each character have been largely reduced. Only characters who have Musou Mode receive original movesets (with the exception of Diao Chan); the rest of the characters playable only in Free Mode have cloned movesets based on the Musou Mode characters with altered properties (with the exception of Xiao Qiao, who retains her fan moveset). Due to the addition of Renbu system, the traditional "fourth weapon" from previous games have been removed with the three normal weapons no longer being quality-based. Each weapons obtained have random stats and effects implemented and the "weight system" from previous game have been replaced by weapon categories; Standard (default type), Strength (greater attack power at the cost of Renbu Gauge being kept for a smaller amount of time), and Skill (greater attack speed with low attack power). In addition to the new weapon system, it is now possible to block from any direction, for example, if a character is attacked from behind while blocking, they will rotate their body with their weapon in front of them to guard against the enemy's attack. This eliminates the need to quickly stop blocking, change direction, and press the guard button again. Unlike previous games, horses can be found by obtaining saddles randomly dropped from boxes or beaten officers. These horses can gain levels, skills, and some can even change into the legendary Red Hare, although this is very rare.

Musou Token which enables the use of Musou Rage have been removed. It is instead replaced by Tome item drop which allows the use of unique special attacks. There are five types of attacks; Swift Attack (increases the player's stats), Volley (launches waves of arrows), Fire (sets eruptions of fire), True Speed (boosts the player's speed), and Rockfall (launches giant boulders from above).

Dueling from Dynasty Warriors 4 returns, but has been revamped; duels now take place on the battlefield and the nearby soldiers will circle around the two fighters, and other officers may jump into the circle, as opposed to the duel taking place in an arena that appears out of nowhere.

Bases have been altered too; they are bigger and where, before, in order to open the outer gate to a base, the player had to defeat a defense captain, now they must simply break it down with attacks. There is also a new corporal unit which guards bases. Defeating troops and corporals within the base reduces the base's defense. When the defense of the base drops to zero, the player has claimed the base. However, defeating the corporal is worth defeating 20 troops while defeating the guard captain will automatically capture the base.

Two new 'innovations' to the series are the abilities to swim and climb ladders. The ladder means that the player can now climb onto castle battlements in scenarios such as the Battle of Hu Lao Gate, and dispose of enemy ballistas and the new 'guard' unit. The first ties in with the improvements to enemy AI, allowing them to travel across rivers and other bodies of water in order to attack you or allied bases. Swimming is now a part of scenarios such as the Battle of Fan Castle.

Characters
The original game features a total of 41 playable characters, a step-down from the previous installment in the series, which featured 48 playable characters. The seven removed characters are Da Qiao, Jiang Wei, Meng Huo, Pang De, Xing Cai, Zhu Rong, and Zuo Ci. Other than brief mentions in cutscenes and character biographies in-game, they otherwise do not make appearance in the game at all. Unlike previous games which featured Musou Modes for all characters, only seventeen of the playable characters received stories, while the others are playable only in Free Mode and Challenge Mode. Dynasty Warriors 6: Special adds Musou Mode for six more characters, while the PSP port of the game adds Meng Huo back to the roster, bringing the character count to 42.

* Denotes characters added through expansion titles
Bold denotes default characters'Reception

The Xbox 360 and PlayStation 3 versions of the game received "mixed" reviews and the PlayStation 2 version received "unfavorable" reviews, according to video game review aggregator Metacritic.  In Japan, Famitsu gave the PlayStation 3 and Xbox 360 versions a score of one eight, one nine, and two eights for a total of 33 out of 40.

GameSpot nominated Dynasty Warriors 6 for 'least improved sequel' in their 2008 award show.

Ryan Clements of IGN said of the Xbox 360 version, "Dynasty Warriors 6 is not a good looking game, and it performs even worse on the PS3 than on the 360 (even when you opt to install the game data)." He did note that "Dynasty Warriors 6 does have a number of cool things to note. The amount of leveling up you can do is fairly impressive and each character's campaign takes at least a few hours to work through, providing you with quite a lot of content (despite the repetition)."

Amanda L. Kondolojy of CheatCodeCentral gave the game one of its better reviews, scoring it at 3.4/5. Kondolojy enjoyed the game, saying that "One aspect of Dynasty Warriors 6 Empires that was surprisingly fun to tinker with was the character creator. Although DW5 Empires had a warlord creator, DW6 Empires gives you more creative control over your newly-made character. In addition to having a wide variety of costumes and customizable features, you can also integrate your character into the main Empire mode as a vagrant, and can work your way up to become leader of the land."

Expansions

PlayStation 2 and PlayStation Portable versionsDynasty Warriors 6 (真・三國無双5: Special) was released on October 2, 2008 on the PlayStation 2 in Japan and November 17, 2008 in North America. In this game, Musou modes for Ma Chao, Yue Ying, Cao Pi, Zhang He, Taishi Ci, and Ling Tong were added, and those six characters received new weapons and movesets (rather than being clones). There are also five new stages introduced in this game. The swimming and dueling abilities were removed, however. The graphics are also significantly reduced and the game suffers from heavy slowdown, most likely due to the memory capabilities.

This version of the game was also released to the PlayStation Portable on September 17, 2009. Likely to coincide with the inclusion of Meng Huo in the Empires expansion, he was additionally added as a Free Mode character in this game.

Dynasty Warriors 6: EmpiresDynasty Warriors 6: Empires was released May 11, 2009 in Japan, June 23, 2009 for North America and June 26 in Europe for PlayStation 3 and Xbox 360. Like all other Empires expansions, the basic premise of the game is to become a leader whose goal is to conquer and maintain all regions of China. However, the player can additionally become a Vagrant (unaligned wanderer) or a vassal serving a lord, in addition to becoming a ruler. The player can step down from any force at any time, betraying their liege, or defecting to another force. The player can also make oaths of friendship with fellow officers and marry other characters.

The level-up system for weapons similar to Dynasty Warriors 4 is introduced. The player can equip various skills and abilities to the weapons. The Renbu system also returns, although it is now merely an element determined by the character's weapons

Meng Huo, who was originally cut from the original game returns with new weapons as well as seven new stages. The game also kept all character changes and new stages exclusive to Dynasty Warriors 6 (PS2/PSP Version).

The Create Character option from Dynasty Warriors 4 returns and greatly revamped; players are given much more freedom in creating characters and the player can create up to 100 characters. Free Mode have been cut from this game however, as the game opted for a more full and rounded Empire Mode. Additionally, the game supports Downloadable Content which mainly includes new costumes for edit characters and music.Dynasty Warriors 6: Empires received "mixed" reviews on both platforms according to video game review aggregator Metacritic.

Kevin VanOrd of GameSpot said that "The combat is still dreadfully repetitive,"  "The visuals are still ugly," and "The sound effects and voice acting are still awful." VanOrd went on to say of Empires, "Environments are bland and lifeless; water looks awful; and character models, while clearly upgraded from Dynasty Warriors 5 Empires'', still look primitive by today's standards," and gave it 5.5/10

References

External links
 Official Dynasty Warriors 6 website, UK 
 Official Dynasty Warriors 6 Empires website, UK 
 Official Dynasty Warriors 6 website 
 Official Dynasty Warriors 6 Empires website 
  
 Official website (Empire) 
 Dynasty Warriors 6 empires information
 
 
 

2007 video games
Dynasty Warriors
Koei games
PlayStation 3 games
PlayStation 2 games
Windows games
Xbox 360 games
PlayStation Portable games
Crowd-combat fighting games
Video games developed in Japan
Video games set in China
Video games based on Chinese mythology
Multiplayer and single-player video games